The following is a list of Major League Baseball players, retired or active. As of the end of the 2011 season, there have been 330 players with a last name that begins with E who have been on a major league roster at some point.

E

References
Last Names starting with E - Baseball-Reference.com

 E